Deborah Chiesa (born 13 June 1996) is a professional Italian tennis player.

On 11 June 2018, she achieved a career-high singles ranking of world No. 143. On 27 February 2017, she peaked at No. 307 in the WTA doubles rankings. Chiesa so far has won three singles and eleven doubles titles on the ITF Women's Circuit.

Her biggest title to date she won at a $50k event in Brescia, partnering Martina Colmegna; they defeated Cindy Burger and Stephanie Vogt in the final.

Grand Slam performance timeline

Singles

ITF finals

Singles: 10 (3 titles, 7 runner–ups)

Doubles: 19 (11 titles, 8 runner-ups)

Notes

References

External links
 
 
 

1996 births
Living people
Italian female tennis players
Sportspeople from Trento
21st-century Italian women